A Mile in His Shoes is a 2011 Canadian made-for-television sports drama film directed by William Dear and starring Luke Schroder, George Canyon and Dean Cain. It was based on the 2008 novel The Legend of Mickey Tussler by Frank Nappi. The setting was changed from Ohio in 1948 in the novel to Bargersville, Indiana in 2002 in the film. The story takes place before autism was a recognized condition and people who had it were thought to have "special needs".

Plot
The film, based on Frank Nappi's critically acclaimed novel "The Legend of Mickey Tussler," centers on Mickey Tussler (Luke Schroder), an 18-year-old from Indiana with Autism, who joins the semi-professional baseball team "the River Rats" after being discovered by Arthur Murphy (Dean Cain). At 18 Mickey has very severe autism. His speaking abilities are limited and he usually refers to himself in the third person and recites poetry to himself when he becomes overwhelmed. Mickey's mother (a clarinetist and poet) is forced by her father to marry a man named Clarence who is illiterate and beats both Molly and Mickey.

The movie introduces Arthur Murphy ("Murph") who sees Mickey pitching apples to his pig and sees a boy with a lot of potential in a baseball career. He talks Molly, Mickey's mother into letting Mickey come with him to be a part of the team. He pairs him with a very nice teammate named Pee Wee who takes Mickey under his wing.

Even though Mickey is a good member of the team, he does not fit in and his teammates constantly make fun of him and haze him. Though the movie's focus is on Mickey's journey and his baseball career, the movie also focuses on the importance of raising awareness about Autism. The movie portrays the importance of giving people with Autism a chance and treating them with respect. Frank Nappi's first book in the series gives each character the chance to show small amounts of their own history, making the story very complex and compelling. The subsequent novels, "Sophomore Campaign" and "Welcome to the Show," delve deeper into the mind and experiences of Mickey, as well as those closest to him.

Cast
Luke Schroder as Mickey Tussler
Dean Cain as Arthur "Murph" Murphy
George Canyon as Clarence
Chilton Crane as Molly Tussler
Jarod Joseph as Pee Wee
Jesse Hutch as George "Lefty" Rogers
Andrew Wheeler as Warren Dennison
Jaren Brandt Bartlett as Raymond "Boxcar" Miller
Anna Mae Wills as Laney Juris
Matthew Robert Kelly as Chip McNally
Lee Tichon as Rocco Hightower
Kenneth W. Yanko as Sheriff Billings
Paul Jarrett as Pastor Bob

References

External links

2011 television films
2011 films
2010s sports drama films
Canadian baseball films
Canadian sports drama films
Canadian drama television films
English-language Canadian films
Films about autism
Films directed by William Dear
Films shot in Vancouver
Films set in Indiana
2010s English-language films
2010s Canadian films
Films about disability